The United States National Professional Road Race Championships began in 1985. They are run by the governing body, USA Cycling. Until 2006 the race was open to all nationalities, the first American to finish being named the winner and given a distinctive jersey. Since the championship in Greenville, South Carolina, in 2006, all riders have had to be American.

Before 1985, only the amateur champions were named.
From 1921 to 1964, the Amateur Bicycle League of America (ABLA) National Championships were held as an omnium of track-style events for Men, Women, and Juniors, rather than as a road race. In 1964 the American Cycling Newsletter (later Bicycling) reported the results of a Flemington, NJ race as the national road racing championships, but these results do not appear in the USA Cycling list of winners.

Men

Amateur

Professional

U23

Junior

Women

Elite

See also
United States National Criterium Championships
United States National Time Trial Championships
United States National Road Race Championships (historical) 1921-1964

Notes

External links 
 USA Cycling
 USA Cycling National Champions
 Pro Cycling Tour
 Women's results at cyclingwebsite.net

National road cycling championships
Cycle races in the United States
Recurring events with year of establishment missing